Lin Po-cheng (林柏辰, born 18 October 1985) is a Taiwanese professional footballer. He made his first appearance for the Chinese Taipei national football team in 2010.

References

Living people
1985 births
Taiwanese footballers
Chinese Taipei international footballers

Association football goalkeepers